Melanophthalma is a genus of beetles in the family Latridiidae, containing the following species:

 Melanophthalma aculifera Fall, 1899
 Melanophthalma aegyptiaca Otto, 1978
 Melanophthalma algirina Motschulsky, 1866
 Melanophthalma americana (Mannerheim, 1844)
 Melanophthalma andrewi Rücker & Johnson 2007
 Melanophthalma angulata (Wollaston, 1871)
 Melanophthalma angulicollis Motschulsky, 1866
 Melanophthalma arabiensis Otto, 1979
 Melanophthalma arborea Rücker, 1981
 Melanophthalma argentea Rücker, 1984
 Melanophthalma atripennis Rücker, 1987
 Melanophthalma australis Dajoz, 1967
 Melanophthalma basicollis Motschulsky, 1866
 Melanophthalma bicolor Wollaston, 1867
 Melanophthalma bifurculata Rücker, 1980
 Melanophthalma birmana Belon, 1891
 Melanophthalma brevilata Rücker, 1981
 Melanophthalma brevis Mika, 2000
 Melanophthalma brincki Dajoz, 1970
 Melanophthalma broadheadi Rücker, 1981
 Melanophthalma cantabrica Otto, 1978
 Melanophthalma casta Fall, 1899
 Melanophthalma castaneipennis Rücker, 1987
 Melanophthalma chamaeropis Fall, 1899
 Melanophthalma chumphonica Míka, 2000
 Melanophthalma claudiae Rücker & Kahlen, 2008
 Melanophthalma complanata Motschulsky, 1866
 Melanophthalma concameratus Rücker, 1985
 Melanophthalma consobrina Rücker, 1987
 Melanophthalma corusca Rücker, 1981
 Melanophthalma crebra Míka, 2000
 Melanophthalma crinifera Rücker, 1987
 Melanophthalma demoulini Dajoz, 1970
 Melanophthalma dentata Dajoz, 1970
 Melanophthalma denticulata Rücker, 1987
 Melanophthalma dewittei Dajoz, 1970
 Melanophthalma difficilis Rücker, 1981
 Melanophthalma dilitata Dajoz, 1970
 Melanophthalma distinguenda (Comolli, 1837)
 Melanophthalma dubia Dajoz, 1970
 Melanophthalma endroedyi Rücker, 1984
 Melanophthalma evansi Johnson, 1972
 Melanophthalma extensa Rey, 1889
 Melanophthalma flavicula Motschulsky, 1866
 Melanophthalma floridana Fall, 1899
 Melanophthalma fluctuosa Rücker, 1981
 Melanophthalma foersteri Rücker, 1987
 Melanophthalma franzi Johnson, 1972
 Melanophthalma fuscipennis (Mannerheim, 1844)
 Melanophthalma gomyi Dajoz, 1972
 Melanophthalma grouvellei Belon, 1899
 Melanophthalma helvola Motschulsky, 1866
 Melanophthalma horaci Míka, 2000
 Melanophthalma horioni Rücker, 1987
 Melanophthalma iguacuis Rücker, 1985
 Melanophthalma immatura Wollaston, 1867
 Melanophthalma inermis Motschulsky, 1866
 Melanophthalma inflexa Rücker, 1979
 Melanophthalma inornata Sharp, 1902
 Melanophthalma insularis Fall, 1899
 Melanophthalma japonica Johnson, 1976
 Melanophthalma keleinikovae Rücker, 1981
 Melanophthalma klapperichi Rücker, 1984
 Melanophthalma lohsei Rücker, 1987
 Melanophthalma majeri Míka, 2000
 Melanophthalma malaysica Míka, 2000
 Melanophthalma maura Motschulsky, 1866
 Melanophthalma melina Rücker, 1987
 Melanophthalma mexicana Dajoz, 1970
 Melanophthalma minutula Rücker, 1981
 Melanophthalma montivaga Rücker, 1987
 Melanophthalma nidicola Grouvelle, 1909
 Melanophthalma nitida Rücker, 1978
 Melanophthalma nodosus Rücker, 1984
 Melanophthalma obliqua Rücker, 1985
 Melanophthalma obliterata Wollaston, 1867
 Melanophthalma ophthalmica Dajoz, 1970
 Melanophthalma pallens (Mannerheim, 1844)
 Melanophthalma panamanensis Rücker, 1981
 Melanophthalma parvicollis (Mannerheim, 1844)
 Melanophthalma penai Rücker, 1978
 Melanophthalma phragmiteticola Franz, 1967
 Melanophthalma picina Motschulsky, 1866
 Melanophthalma picta (Le Conte, 1855)
 Melanophthalma pilosa Rücker, 1978
 Melanophthalma pilosaformis Rücker, 1981
 Melanophthalma pilosella Motschulsky, 1866
 Melanophthalma placida Sharp, 1902
 Melanophthalma plicatulus Reitter, 1877
 Melanophthalma proximulata Rücker, 1980
 Melanophthalma prudeki Mika, 2000
 Melanophthalma pumila (Le Conte, 1855)
 Melanophthalma ranongica Míka, 2000
 Melanophthalma rectusa Rücker, 1984
 Melanophthalma redunculata Rücker, 1981
 Melanophthalma remota Sharp, 1902
 Melanophthalma retroculis Motschulsky, 1866
 Melanophthalma rhenana Rücker & Johnson, 2007
 Melanophthalma rispini Rücker & Johnson, 2007
 Melanophthalma rostrata Rücker, 1981
 Melanophthalma rothschildi Pic, 1908
 Melanophthalma rubi Rücker, 1987
 Melanophthalma rugifera Rücker, 1987
 Melanophthalma russula Motschulsky, 1866
 Melanophthalma sagitta Rücker, 1984
 Melanophthalma sakagutii Johnson, 1976
 Melanophthalma scitula Rücker, 1987
 Melanophthalma seminigra Belon, 1885
 Melanophthalma sericea (Mannerheim, 1844)
 Melanophthalma similis Míka, 2000
 Melanophthalma simplex Fall, 1899
 Melanophthalma simpliata Rücker, 1980
 Melanophthalma solitaria Rücker, 1987
 Melanophthalma subornata Rücker, 1987
 Melanophthalma subvillosa Johnson, 1972
 Melanophthalma suturalis (Mannerheim, 1844)
 Melanophthalma synavei Dajoz, 1970
 Melanophthalma taurica (Mannerheim, 1844)
 Melanophthalma transversalis (Gyllenhal, 1827)
 Melanophthalma unidentata Rücker, 1981
 Melanophthalma valida Rücker, 1978
 Melanophthalma venusta Rücker, 1987
 Melanophthalma videns Otto, 1979
 Melanophthalma villosa Zimmermann, 1869
 Melanophthalma wittmeri Otto, 1978

References

Latridiidae genera